The Franklin-McKinley School District is composed of 14 elementary schools, 3 middle schools, and 3 charter schools in San Jose, California, USA.

References

External links
 

School districts in San Jose, California